Jens Dalsgaard Stage (born 8 November 1996) is a Danish professional footballer who plays for Bundesliga side Werder Bremen and the Denmark national team. Stage is a versatile player, who has been deployed as a full-back, midfielder, winger and forward.

Club career

AGF
On 27 January 2016, it was confirmed that Stage had signed a contract with AGF. Previously, he played for Brabrand IF. Before his transfer, he played matches for the reserve team of AGF. He also trained with FC Midtjylland in 2015.

On 8 May 2016, Stage got his professional and Superliga debut for AGF, in a match against FC Midtjylland. He started on the bench, replacing Dino Mikanović in the 84th minute. Stage's contract got extended in December 2016 until 2019.

Copenhagen
On 1 July 2019, FC Copenhagen announced, that they had signed Stage from AGF on a five-year contract, after he had rejected several offers from foreign clubs. Shortly after signing, in mid-July, Stage's apartment in Aarhus was subjected to vandalism and arson. An object was thrown through a window and, according to AGF, was the cause of a "minor fire damage". FC Copenhagen distanced themselves from the vandalism on their official website. AGF offered their assistance to local police, who following the incident began an investigation of the case. According to DR, no major damage was done to the apartment as the fire went out again shortly after it was ignited. AGF's chairman, Jacob Nielsen, stated on AGF's official website that if the perpetrators "are identified and it turns out that the perpetrators have some connection to our fan base, then they will – in addition to a civil sentence – get a lifelong suspension for all AGF's matches".

Stage made his debut for Copenhagen on 14 July 2019 in a 3–2 away victory over OB in the Superliga, where he came on as a substitute in the 69th minute for Robert Skov. He was also a substitute in his second match for the club, before making his first start in the subsequent match away against Horsens.

He made his UEFA Europa League group stage debut on 19 September 2019 in a 1–0 win over Swiss side Lugano.

Werder Bremen
On 29 June 2022, newly promoted Bundesliga club Werder Bremen confirmed that they had signed Stage. The contract duration was undisclosed. Danish tabloid Ekstra Bladet reported the transfer fee paid to Copenhagen as DKK 45 (€6 million) while various bonuses could send the amount up towards DKK 60 million (€8 million). According to German newspaper Deichstube, the transfer fee was €4 million plus bonuses and Stage signed a four-year contract.

International career
Stage made his debut for the Denmark national team on 15 November 2021 in a World Cup qualifier against Scotland.

Career statistics

References

External links
 

1996 births
Living people
Danish men's footballers
Footballers from Aarhus
Association football utility players
Denmark international footballers
Denmark youth international footballers
Denmark under-21 international footballers
Danish Superliga players
Bundesliga players
ASA Fodbold players
IF Lyseng Fodbold players
Aarhus Gymnastikforening players
F.C. Copenhagen players
SV Werder Bremen players
Danish expatriate men's footballers
Danish expatriate sportspeople in Germany
Expatriate footballers in Germany